Cao Zhibai (1271–1355) was a renowned Chinese painter and bibliophile from the Yuan Dynasty. His courtesy name was Youxuan or Zhensu, and sobriquet Yunxi. His painting style was similar to that of Zhao Mengfu, who helped revitalize the Li-Guo landscape painting style in the Yuan period.

References

Further reading 

 Barnhart, R. M. et al. (1997). Three thousand years of Chinese painting. New Haven, Yale University Press. 

1272 births
1355 deaths
Yuan dynasty painters
13th-century Chinese painters
14th-century Chinese painters